Nicklas Jadeland (born 13 May 1986) is a Swedish professional ice hockey player. He is currently playing for IK Pantern in the Hockeytrean. He has previously played with the Malmö Redhawks in the Swedish Hockey League (SHL).

External links

1986 births
Bofors IK players
IK Oskarshamn players
Living people
Malmö Redhawks players
Swedish ice hockey forwards
Sportspeople from Malmö
21st-century Swedish people